Jiwar al-Afas (also spelled Jewar al-Afs) is a village in northern Syria located west of Homs in the Homs Governorate. According to the Syria Central Bureau of Statistics, Jiwar al-Afas had a population of 385 in the 2004 census. Its inhabitants are predominantly Greek Orthodox and Greek Catholic Christians. The village has a Greek Orthodox Church and a Greek Catholic Church

References

Populated places in Talkalakh District
Eastern Orthodox Christian communities in Syria
Christian communities in Syria